Lori McNeil won in the final 6–1, 6–3 against Elna Reinach.

Seeds
A champion seed is indicated in bold text while text in italics indicates the round in which that seed was eliminated.

  Arantxa Sánchez Vicario (second round)
  Manuela Maleeva (quarterfinals)
  Susan Sloane (first round)
  Raffaella Reggi (second round)
  Lori McNeil (champion)
  Amy Frazier (semifinals)
  Anne Minter (quarterfinals)
  Jenny Byrne (first round)

Draw

External links
 1989 Virginia Slims of Albuquerque Draw

Virginia Slims of Albuquerque
1989 WTA Tour